The Second Chance is a 2006 drama film, directed by veteran musician Steve Taylor. The film won Best Feature Film at the Christian WYSIWYG Film Festival.

The film was released in the United States on February 17, 2006 to a limited number of theaters; the widest release was 87 theaters.  As of its close date, March 5, 2006, the film had grossed $463,542.

Plot summary
Ethan Jenkins (Michael W. Smith) is a pastor who enjoys working with his well-to-do congregation.  At the request of his father, Ethan takes an assignment at Second Chance Church, where he meets Jake Sanders (Jeff Obafemi Carr), a pastor who lives in a completely different world from Ethan's, and spends much of his time dealing with poverty, drugs, and crime. The two different lifestyles of these two pastors cause an inevitable conflict as these two men try to bridge the divide.

Nominations and awards
6th Annual Christian WYSIWYG Film Festival
 Winner, Best Feature Film

Production notes
Taylor did not intend this film to be considered a Christian film. He told Christianity Today that "One of the reasons we've avoided the tag "Christian film" is because it's the kiss of death—it's not an apocalyptic thriller or a conversion story. It's a redemption story, set in the world of these two churches, and we wanted to tell an authentic story deep in those settings."  This is the first film in which Michael W. Smith, a contemporary Christian composer, singer, and musician, has acted.

The film was shot mostly on location in Nashville, Tennessee.  The area was mainly in and around East Nashville between 2nd and 4th Avenues. One featured spot of note shows the front facade of the former Pearl Cohn Comprehensive High School at 17th Avenue and Jo Johnston.

Soundtrack

References

External links
 
 
 

2006 drama films
2006 films
Films about evangelicalism
Triumph Films films
2000s English-language films
Films directed by Steve Taylor